Amplirhagada montalivetensis is a species of air-breathing land snail, a terrestrial pulmonate gastropod mollusks in the family Camaenidae. This species is endemic to Australia.

References

Gastropods of Australia
montalivetensis
Gastropods described in 1894
Taxonomy articles created by Polbot